Cannelton High School is a high school in Cannelton, Indiana.  Cannelton  It is the second smallest public high school in the state of Indiana.  The high school building, built in 1922, serves as the Jr/Sr high school building. It is one of three high schools in Perry County, Indiana.

Athletics
The Cannelton Bulldogs compete in Volleyball, Basketball, Track, Boys Cross Country, Baseball, and Softball.

See also
 List of high schools in Indiana

References

External links
Cannelton City Schools

Public high schools in Indiana
IHSAA Conference-Independent Schools
High schools in Southwestern Indiana

Schools in Perry County, Indiana
1922 establishments in Indiana